Milton "Carioquinha" Setrini Júnior (born 4 January 1951), also commonly known as Carioquinha, is a Brazilian former professional basketball player and coach.

Playing career
During his pro club career, Carioquinha won 2 Brazilian Championships, in the seasons 1977 and 1981 (I).

With the senior Brazilian national basketball team, Carioquinha competed at the following major world tournaments: the 1974 FIBA World Cup, the 1978 FIBA World Cup, the 1980 Summer Olympics, the 1982 FIBA World Cup, and the 1984 Summer Olympics.

Coaching career
After his basketball playing career ended, Carioquinha began a career working as a basketball coach.

References

External links
 

1951 births
Living people
Brazilian basketball coaches
Brazilian men's basketball players
1974 FIBA World Championship players
1978 FIBA World Championship players
1982 FIBA World Championship players
Basketball players at the 1980 Summer Olympics
Basketball players at the 1984 Summer Olympics
Basketball players at the 1971 Pan American Games
Basketball players at the 1975 Pan American Games
Basketball players at the 1979 Pan American Games
Basketball players at the 1983 Pan American Games
Pan American Games gold medalists for Brazil
Pan American Games silver medalists for Brazil
Pan American Games bronze medalists for Brazil
Pan American Games medalists in basketball
Esporte Clube Pinheiros basketball players
Esporte Clube Sírio basketball players
Flamengo basketball players
Minas Tênis Clube basketball players
Olympic basketball players of Brazil
São José Basketball players
Shooting guards
Sociedade Esportiva Palmeiras basketball players
Basketball players from São Paulo
Unitri/Uberlândia basketball coaches
Medalists at the 1971 Pan American Games
Medalists at the 1979 Pan American Games